The George F. Donnelly Cup was an annual amateur soccer competition organized by the United States Adult Soccer Association. It is named after George F. Donnelly, president of the former National Soccer League and prominent figure in promoting soccer in the United States.

The competition includes a men's tournament and a women's tournament. Each tournament is composed of four "Regional Select" teams (one for each region in the USASA), who have competed as "State Select" teams in regional qualifying tournaments. These select teams are made up of the best amateur players within any given state's soccer association.

The Donnelly Cup, until 2009, was held each year during the Martin L. King Jr. holiday weekend in January. Prior to 2003, it was conducted during Thanksgiving Day weekend in November.

In 2010, the competition was staged during July in Lancaster, MA, and won for the third time by the Connecticut State Soccer Association (CSSA) entry.

Champions

Men
2010 - Connecticut State Select Team Region I
2008 - Illinois State Select Team Region II
2007 - Illinois State Select Team Region II
2006 - North Texas State Select Team Region III
2005 - North Texas State Select Team Region III
2004 - California-South State Select Team Region IV
2003 - California-South State Select Team Region IV
2002 - California-South State Select Team Region IV
2001 - Connecticut State Select Team Region I
2000 - Eastern New York State Select Team Region I
1999 - Connecticut State Select Team Region I
1998 - Oregon State Select Team Region IV
1997 - Florida State Select Team Region III
1996 - California-North State Select Team Region IV
1995 - Indiana State Select Team Region II
1994 - Eastern New York State Select Team Region I
1993 - California-South State Select Team Region IV
1992 - Florida State Select Team Region III
1991 - Washington State Select Team Region IV
1990 - Minnesota State Select Team Region II

Women
2008 - Utah State Select Team Region IV
2007 - Illinois State Select Team Region II 
2006 - California South State Select Team Region IV
2005 - California South State Select Team Region IV
2004 - Illinois State Select Team Region II
2003 - Illinois State Select Team Region II
2002 - California-North State Select Team Region IV
2001 - Massachusetts State Select Team Region I
2000 - California-North State Select Team Region IV
1999 - Utah State Select Team Region IV
1998 - Oregon State Select Team Region IV
1997 - California-North State Select Team Region IV
1996 - Eastern New York State Select Team Region I
1995 - California-South State Select Team Region IV
1994 - Minnesota State Select Team Region II
1993 - Metropolitan D.C.-Virginia State Select Team Region I
1992 - Metropolitan D.C.-Virginia State Select Team Region I
1991 - Metropolitan D.C.-Virginia State Select Team Region I
1990 - California-North State Select Team Region IV

References

External links
USASA

Soccer cup competitions in the United States
United States Adult Soccer Association